The All-American Association was an independent minor league that existed in the southern United States in 2001. Total attendance in 2001 was 200,970.  The league folded after the end of the season and four of the league's six teams joined other leagues.  The Fort Worth Cats and Tyler Roughnecks joined the Central Baseball League (Tyler relocated to Jackson, Mississippi in January 2002 and became the Jackson Senators).  The Baton Rouge Blue Marlins (renamed "River Bats") and Montgomery Wings joined the Southeastern League.

2001 Teams

2001 Final Standings

2001 Post-Season
Semifinals (best-of-3)
Baton Rouge defeated Fort Worth, 2 games to 0
Albany defeated Tyler, 2 games to 1

2001 All-American Association Championship Series (best-of-5)
Baton Rouge defeated Albany, 3 games to 2

See also
Independent baseball

External links
Baseball-Reference.com
Independent Baseball Leagues

Defunct independent baseball leagues in the United States
Baseball leagues in Alabama
Baseball leagues in Georgia (U.S. state)
Baseball leagues in Louisiana
Baseball leagues in Texas
Baseball leagues in Tennessee
Sports leagues established in 2001
Sports leagues disestablished in 2001
2001 establishments in the United States
2001 disestablishments in the United States
Defunct minor baseball leagues in the United States